The men's 10 kilometre classical cross-country skiing competition at the 1998 Winter Olympics in Nagano, Japan, was held on 12 February at  Snow Harp in Nozawa Onsen.

Each skier started at half a minute intervals, skiing the entire 10 kilometre course. Bjørn Dæhlie was the 1997 World champion. Dæhlie was also defending Olympic champion due to his win in 1994 Olympics in Lillehammer.

Bjørn Dæhlie won the race, and memorably insisted that the medals ceremony be delayed as he waited at the finish line to greet the final athlete to complete the race, Philip Boit of Kenya, who was the first Kenyan to compete in a Winter Olympics.

Results

References

External links
 Final results (International Ski Federation)

Men's cross-country skiing at the 1998 Winter Olympics
Men's 10 kilometre cross-country skiing at the Winter Olympics